Kostoľany pod Tribečom is a village and municipality in Zlaté Moravce District of the Nitra Region, in western-central Slovakia.

History
In historical records the village was first mentioned in 1113.

Geography
The municipality lies at an altitude of 245 metres and covers an area of 22.122 km². It has a population of about 355 people.

Economy
The village is almost exclusively dedicated to stockbreeding and agriculture, specializing in wine.

Genealogical resources

The records for genealogical research are available at the state archive "Statny Archiv in Nitra, Slovakia"

 Roman Catholic church records (births/marriages/deaths): 1713-1901 (parish B)

Church of Saint George
The Church of Saint George (Kostol svätého Juraja) is a simple one-nave church of pre-romanesque origin with later romanesque, baroque and modern extensions. It lies on the hill in the eastern part of the village. In 1960, the church acquired interest of experts after the discovery of medieval paintings and further research led to dating to the period before the second half of the 11th century. Subsequently, the church had been referenced  in literature for decades as an oldest remaining sacral building in Slovakia. After breakthrough discoveries in Kopčany and revised dating of Church of St. Margaret of Antioch, a revised archeological and artistic research have been done also in Kostoľany pod Tribečom. 

The church belongs to remaining sacral buildings in Slovakia that are considered to be of potential Great Moravian origin. The result of chronometric research of masonry published in 2015 indices that the church was built at the end of the 9th or in the first third of the 10th century.

Gallery

References

Sources

External links
Official homepage
Surnames of living people in Kostolany pod Tribecom

Villages and municipalities in Zlaté Moravce District